Phillips House is a historic home located at Poughkeepsie, Dutchess County, New York.  It was built about 1891 and is a two-story, Queen Anne–style dwelling with an asymmetrical, slate-covered roof.  It features a front porch with turned posts and balusters and scalloped shingle and spool decoration.

It was added to the National Register of Historic Places in 1982.

References

Houses on the National Register of Historic Places in New York (state)
Queen Anne architecture in New York (state)
Houses completed in 1891
Houses in Poughkeepsie, New York
National Register of Historic Places in Poughkeepsie, New York